Franny K. Stein is a children's book series by American author Jim Benton. The series was first published in 2003 with the entry Lunch Walks Among Us by Simon & Schuster. The titles of the series all play on book or movie titles, such as Attack of the 50 Foot Woman and Fantastic Voyage.

Synopsis
The Franny K. Stein follows its titular character Franny, a 7-year-old young girl that's ostracized from her classmates due to her strange behaviors and experiments. Throughout the series Fran is often called upon to battle various creatures or put into weird situations, sometimes ones that she herself contributed to either accidentally or deliberately.

Film adaptation
In 2007 it was announced that film rights to the series were optioned by East of Doheny, with plans to create a series of animated films. No director or writer for the movie has been announced and there have been no further announcements on the series' progress.

Reception
Critical reception for the series has been mostly positive, with the School Library Journal praising the series for being "age appropriate" and having an appeal to both boys and girls. Publishers Weekly has also given the series a positive rating, calling the first book a "copiously and cartoonishly illustrated novel". Kirkus Reviews gave an overall positive review but stated (with a degree of sarcasm) that it "isn’t anything like a blatant grab for Captain Underpants fans, oh no".

Awards
Gryphon Honor Award, 2004 (Lunch Walks Among Us)
Golden Duck Award, 2006 (The Fran That Time Forgot)

Books

References

External links
Official website
Video of Benton discussing the series (Simon & Schuster)

American children's books
Works based on Frankenstein
Comedy books
Series of children's books
2000s children's books
Science fiction